Siege of Smolensk can refer to several battles:

Siege of Smolensk (1502) during Muscovite–Lithuanian War (1500–1503)
Siege of Smolensk (1514) during the fourth Muscovite–Lithuanian War (1512–1522)
Siege of Smolensk (1609–1611) during the Polish–Muscovite War (1605–1618)
Siege of Smolensk (1613–1617) during the Polish–Muscovite War (1605–1618)
Siege of Smolensk (1632–1633) during the Smolensk War (1632–1634)
Siege of Smolensk (1654) during the Russo-Polish War (1654–1667)

See also
 Battle of Smolensk (disambiguation)